My Hair may refer to:

 "My Hair", a song by the Maine from American Candy (2015)
 "My Hair", a song by Ariana Grande from Positions (2020)

See also 
 Hair (disambiguation)